Świecino is a village in the administrative district of Gmina Krokowa, within Puck County, Pomeranian Voivodeship, in northern Poland.

Świecino is famous for a battle fought in 1462 between the Polish forces and the Teutonic Knights. See Battle of Świecino. An event reconstructing the battle proceedings was last held on the village grounds on 2 August 2014. The event is annual and runs for a couple of years.

For more details of the history of the region, see History of Pomerania.

The village has a population of 203.

References

Villages in Puck County